Johnny Jernigan is an American football coach and former player. He currently serves as a defensive analyst at Tulane University in New Orleans, Louisiana.  In 2002, he served as the interim head coach at the University of Tennessee at Martin.

References

Year of birth missing (living people)
Living people
Georgia Southern Eagles football coaches
Henderson State Reddies football coaches
Junior college football coaches in the United States
Murray State Racers football coaches
Sam Houston Bearkats football coaches
Stephen F. Austin Lumberjacks football players
Tulane Green Wave football coaches
Tyler Apaches football players
UT Martin Skyhawks football coaches